Luke Anthony Lawal Jr. (born June 15, 1989) is an American entrepreneur from Washington, D.C. He is the founder and CEO of HBCU Buzz, a media outlet with a primary focus on HBCUs. In 2016 he was recognized at #96 on The Root’s 100 Black Influencers List.

Early life
Born and raised in Washington, D.C., Lawal attended Bladensburg High School. He attended Bowie State University where he became a member of Omega Psi Phi fraternity and received a degree in biochemistry in 2012. His mother also attended an HBCU as a double alumnus of Howard University.

Career
Lawal first began working on HBCU Buzz in 2009 after attending a Bowie State Student Government Association trip to Florida A&M. With a few of his colleagues, Lawal expanded HBCU Buzz to incorporate all HBCU campuses. Sometime after making an online blog, he created an HBCU store, HBCU Awards, and a print HBCU Buzz Magazine. Leading up to the United States presidential election, Luke launched HBCU Buzz's video content and brand extensions with the Thurgood Marshall College Fund, HBCUs for Obama, and political on-campus events across the nation. Following this campaign, Al Sharpton recognized Luke at #29 on the Top 30 Under 30 for the DMV. In 2016 he partnered with Black Enterprise to better serve the needs of the black community. Following that partnership, Lawal founded L & Company, an integrated marketing and consulting agency that oversees HBCU Buzz.

References

External links

 

1989 births
Living people
African-American businesspeople
American chief executives
Bowie State University alumni
People from Washington, D.C.
21st-century African-American people
20th-century African-American people